Maureen O'Carroll (29 March 1913 – 9 May 1984) was an Irish Labour Party politician who served as a Teachta Dála (TD) for the Dublin North-Central constituency from 1954 to 1957. She led the way with women border guards and ensuring that the word "illegitimate" no longer appeared on birth certificates.

Background
She was the eldest child of Michael McHugh and Elizabeth O’Dowd. Her father had been a participant in the Easter Rising as well as a journalist, and was very influential upon her. She was educated at Jesus and Mary College in Gortnor Abbey in Crossmolina, County Mayo on a scholarship before moving to University College Galway. She returned to Gortnor Abbey to become a Novitiate (novice nun), however, she later decided not to commit to that life. By 1936, she was a civil servant and had married her husband Gerard. Later she became school teacher and mother of eleven children (including comedians Brendan and Eilish O'Carroll).

O'Carroll died in 1984, shortly after her grandson Danny was born, his sister Fiona was just 3 years old at the time.

Political career
She entered politics as a founder of the Lower Prices Council, which campaigned against high prices, scarcity and black marketeering in the aftermath of World War II.

She was elected to Dáil Éireann on her first attempt, at the 1954 general election to the 15th Dáil, when she was the third candidate to be elected in the three-seat Dublin North–Central constituency, defeating sitting Fianna Fáil TD Colm Gallagher. She served as Labour's Chief Whip from 1954 to 1957, and was the first woman to hold that position in any Irish political party.

During her time as a TD, she was credited with introducing female members to the Garda Síochána, then known as Ban Gardaí (Women Guards). The Ban Gardaí would later serve as her guard of honour at her funeral in 1984. She is also credited as helping to remove the status of "illegitimate" from birth certificates.

At the 1957 general election, she was defeated and Gallagher retook the seat. O'Carroll did not stand again for election to the Dáil.

References

1913 births
1984 deaths
20th-century women Teachtaí Dála
Alumni of the University of Galway
Irish schoolteachers
Labour Party (Ireland) TDs
Members of the 15th Dáil
People educated at Gortnor Abbey